Sympistis kelsoensis is a species of moth in the family Noctuidae (the owlet moths). It is found in North America.

The MONA or Hodges number for Sympistis kelsoensis is 10063.1.

References

Further reading

External links

 

kelsoensis
Moths described in 2006